Sean Jones (born May 29, 1978 in Warren, Ohio) is an American trumpeter and composer featured on the 2007 Grammy Award-winning album Turned to Blue by Nancy Wilson. As a bandleader, Jones has released seven albums under the Mack Avenue Records label. He performs with his own groups both nationally and internationally. Jones often plays at music venues and jazz festivals such as the Monterey Jazz Festival, Detroit International Jazz Festival, the Vail Jazz Festival and Montreal International Jazz Festival.

Background 
Among Jones' first musical experiences were the gospel music he heard while attending Saint James' Church of God in Christ in Warren, Ohio, where he sang and performed with the choir. As a beginning musician, Jones started on the drums and switched to trumpet in the fifth grade after his grandmother told him about his grandfather playing the instrument during World War II. Jones developed an interest in jazz music around the same time, after receiving two Miles Davis albums from his band instructor, namely Kind of Blue and Tutu.

By the time he entered Warren G. Harding High School, Jones had decided to pursue a career as a professional musician, and studied classical trumpet as well as jazz. In 2000, Jones obtained an undergraduate degree in classical trumpet performance from Youngstown State University and later a master's degree from Rutgers University, where he studied under Professor William Fielder, who had also taught Wynton Marsalis, among others. As a session musician, Jones has performed with several notable ensembles and musicians, including Tia Fuller, Gerald Wilson, Joe Lovano, Tom Harrell, Marcus Miller, Jon Faddis, Jimmy Heath and Frank Foster.

In 2004, Jones had a six-month stint with the Lincoln Center Jazz Orchestra, after which Marsalis offered him a position with the ensemble as a third trumpeter then moved to the lead chair a couple months later. Around the same time, Jones became a music professor at Duquesne University, and lived in the Pittsburgh area for several years. 

In 2011, he performed “A tribute to Miles” with Wayne Shorter, Herbie Hancock, Marcus Miller and Sean Rickman.

Jones has recently been selected as the Interim Artistic Director for the Cleveland Jazz Orchestra. He became an associate professor of Jazz Trumpet at Oberlin Conservatory for the 2012-2013 academic year. He was a member of the SFJAZZ Collective from 2015 - 2017. He previously served as head of the Brass Department at Berklee College of Music. He currently serves as the chair of the jazz studies department of the Peabody Institute at Johns Hopkins University in Baltimore, MD. Jones is also on the board of directors and is president-elect of Jazz Education Network (JEN).

Jones is currently represented by Unlimited Myles, Inc.

Discography

As leader
 2004: Eternal Journey (Mack Avenue)
 2005: Gemini (Mack Avenue)
 2006: Roots  (Mack Avenue)
 2007: Kaleidoscope (Mack Avenue)
 2009: The Search Within (Mack Avenue)
 2011  No Need for Words (Mack Avenue)
 2014  im*pro*vise: never before seen (Mack Avenue)
 2017 Live from Jazz at the Bistro (Mack Avenue)

As sideman/contributor
2002: Live @ Zanzibar Blue, Charles Famborough
2003: New York, New Sound Gerald Wilson Orchestra (Mack Avenue)
2005: In My Time, Gerald Wilson Orchestra (Mack Avenue)
2005: Sonic Tonic, Ron Blake  (Mack Avenue)
2006: It Makes Me Glad, Teddy Pantelas Trio (Tatsou)
2006:Turned to Blue, Nancy Wilson (MCG Jazz)
2007: Healing Space, Tia Fuller (Mack Avenue)
2007 Monterey Moods, Gerald Wilson Orchestra (Mack Avenue)
2007: Rainbow People, Steve Turre (HighNote)
2009: Detroit, Gerald Wilson Orchestra (Mack Avenue)
2010: Decisive Steps, Tia Fuller (Mack Avenue)
2011: Legacy, Gerald Wilson Orchestra (Mack Avenue)
2011: Blues For Pekar (Ernie Krivda album) , Ernie Krivda Tenor Sax, Sean Jones Trumpet, Dominick Farinacci Flugelhorn
2019: Soul Awakening, Brandee Younger (Independent)

Compilations
2006: Legends & Lions: Blues    (Mack Avenue)
2006: Legends & Lions: Swoonin' (Mack Avenue)
2006: Legends & Lions: Swingin' (Mack Avenue)
2007: Compilations (Tri-Valley YMCA)
2014: Live From The Detroit Jazz Festival - 2013 (Mack Avenue)
2014: It's Christmas on Mack Avenue (Mack Avenue)

Awards and nominations
2007: Downbeat Magazine Rising Star
2007: JazzTimes Magazine Reader's Poll Best New Artist
2007: Jazz Journalists Association Trumpeter of the Year (Nominated)
2006: Downbeat Magazine'' Rising Star

References

External links 
Sean Jones Website
Sean Jones Artist Page

All About Jazz profile

American bandleaders
American session musicians
American trumpeters
American male trumpeters
Living people
1978 births
Rutgers University alumni
People from Warren, Ohio
African-American jazz musicians
21st-century trumpeters
Jazz musicians from Ohio
21st-century American male musicians
American male jazz musicians
SFJAZZ Collective members
Mack Avenue Records artists
21st-century African-American musicians
20th-century African-American people